Modúbar de la Emparedada is a municipality and town located in the province of Burgos, Castile and León, Spain. According to the 2004 census (INE), the municipality has a population of 367 inhabitants.

References

External links
CATÁLOGO MUNICIPAL DE BIENES INTEGRANTES DEL PATRIMONIO ARQUEOLÓGICO Y NORMAS PARA SU PROTECCIÓN 

Municipalities in the Province of Burgos